The Tramweg Maatschappij Zutphen-Emmerik was a  gauge steam tram that operated over  of track between Deventer, Zutphen and Doetinchem in the Netherlands and Emmerich in Germany.

See also 
 Narrow-gauge railways in the Netherlands

References 

Steam trams in the Netherlands
750 mm gauge railways in the Netherlands
750 mm gauge railways in Germany
Railway lines opened in 1902
Railway lines closed in 1954
History of Gelderland
History of North Rhine-Westphalia
History of Overijssel